New Carnival Games is a party video game developed by Cat Daddy Games released on September 21, 2010 for the Wii and Nintendo DS. The game was  published by 2K Play and is a sequel to Carnival Games and Carnival Games: Mini-Golf.

Features
The game features over 30 minigames. It can support the Wii MotionPlus accessory, but it is not really required to play the game. For the Wii, there will be a four player multiplayer play mode with cooperative and competitive gameplay.

References

2010 video games
2K games
Nintendo DS games
Party video games
Video games developed in the United States
Wii games
Wii MotionPlus games
Cat Daddy Games games
Multiplayer and single-player video games